The Alaska Range is a relatively narrow, 600-mile-long (950 km) mountain range in the southcentral region of the U.S. state of Alaska, from Lake Clark at its southwest end to the White River in Canada's Yukon Territory in the southeast.  The highest mountain in North America, Denali, is in the Alaska Range. It is part of the American Cordillera.

The Alaska range is one of the higher ranges in the world after the Himalayas and the Andes.

Description and history

The range forms a generally east–west arc with its northernmost part in the center, and from there trending southwest towards the Alaska Peninsula and the Aleutian Islands, and trending southeast into British Columbia and the Pacific Coast Ranges. The mountains act as a high barrier to the flow of moist air from the Gulf of Alaska northwards, and thus have some of the harshest weather in the world.  The heavy snowfall also contributes to a number of large glaciers, including the Cantwell, Castner, Black Rapids, Susitna, Yanert, Muldrow, Eldridge, Ruth, Tokositna, and Kahiltna Glaciers. Four major rivers cross the Alaska Range, including the Delta and Nenana Rivers in the center of the range and the Nabesna and Chisana Rivers to the east.

The range is part of the Pacific Ring of Fire, and the Denali Fault that runs along its southern edge is responsible for many major earthquakes. Mount Spurr is a stratovolcano located at the northeastern end of the Aleutian Volcanic Arc which has two vents, the summit and nearby Crater Peak.

Parts of the Alaska Range are protected within Wrangell-St. Elias National Park and Preserve, Denali National Park and Preserve, and Lake Clark National Park and Preserve. The George Parks Highway from Anchorage to Fairbanks, the Richardson Highway from Valdez to Fairbanks, and the Tok Cut-Off from Gulkana Junction to Tok, Alaska pass through low parts of the range. The Alaska Pipeline parallels the Richardson Highway.

Naming history
The name "Alaskan Range" appears to have been first applied to these mountains in 1869 by naturalist W. H. Dall. The name eventually became "Alaska Range" through local use. In 1849 Constantin Grewingk applied the name "Tschigmit" to this mountain range. A map made by the General Land Office in 1869 calls the southwestern part of the Alaska Range the "Chigmit Mountains" and the northeastern part the "Beaver Mountains". However, the Chigmit Mountains are now considered part of the Aleutian Range.

Major peaks

 Denali (20,310 ft/ 6,190.5 m)
 Mount Foraker (17,400 ft/ 5,304 m)
 Mount Hunter (14,573 ft/ 4,442 m)
 Mount Hayes (13,832 ft/ 4,216 m)
 Mount Silverthrone (13,218 ft/ 4,029 m)
 Mount Moffit (13,020 ft/ 3,970 m)
 Mount Deborah (12,339 ft/ 3,761 m)
 Mount Huntington (12,240 ft/ 3,730 m)
 Mount Brooks (11,890 ft/ 3,624 m)
 Mount Russell (11,670 ft/ 3,557 m)

Subranges (from west to east)

 Neacola Mountains
 Revelation Mountains
 Teocalli Mountains
 Kichatna Mountains
 Central Alaska Range/Denali Massif
 Eastern Alaska Range/Hayes Range
 Delta Mountains
 Mentasta Mountains
 Nutzotin Mountains

Documented wilderness traverses of Alaska Range

 Mentasta Lake to Kitchatna Mountains (1981): Scott Woolums, George Beilstein, Steve Eck, and Larry Coxen by skis: first traverse.  in 45 days.
 Canada to Lake Clark (1996): Roman Dial, Carl Tobin, and Paul Adkins by mountain bike and packraft:  first full-length traverse.  in 42 days.
 Tok to Lake Clark (1996): Kevin Armstrong, Doug Woody, and Jeff Ottmers by snowshoe, foot, and packraft: first foot traverse.  in 90 days.
Lake Clark to Mentasta Lake (2016): Gavin McClurg by paraglider and foot: first vol-biv (fly/camp) traverse.  in 37 days.
Cantwell/Yakutat to Unimak Island (2020): Quoc Nguyen and Dan Binde by foot and packraft. 2,500 miles (4,023 km) in 120 days.

See also
 Summit Lake, Alaska

References

Further reading

 Churkin, M., Jr., and C. Carter. (1996). Stratigraphy, structure, and graptolites of an Ordovician and Silurian sequence in the Terra Cotta Mountains, Alaska Range, Alaska [U.S. Geological Survey Professional Paper 1555]. Washington, D.C.: U.S. Department of the Interior, U.S. Geological Survey.

 
Landforms of Bethel Census Area, Alaska
Landforms of Copper River Census Area, Alaska
Landforms of Southeast Fairbanks Census Area, Alaska
Landforms of Yukon–Koyukuk Census Area, Alaska
Mountain ranges of Yukon
Mountains of Denali Borough, Alaska
Mountains of Kenai Peninsula Borough, Alaska
Mountains of Lake and Peninsula Borough, Alaska
Mountains of Matanuska-Susitna Borough, Alaska
Mountains of Unorganized Borough, Alaska